Contingency Location Garoua is a United States Army base in Garoua, Cameroon. Approximately 200 personnel work at the site. The site is located adjacent to Cameroonian Air Force Base 301.

Operations

The base is used to support military operations against Boko Haram. Soldiers from the 10th Mountain Division were stationed at the base from October 2017.

Facilities
The camp maintains a Role 1 aid station.

References

Garoua
Installations of the United States Army